Saint Ascholius  (Ἀσχόλιος, d. 383/4) was Bishop of Thessalonica from AD 379 until his death, at the time of the adoption of Christianity as the state religion of the Roman Empire. 
He baptized Emperor Theodosius I.
Ascholius  was appointed Bishop of Thessalonica by  Damasus, Bishop of Rome in an attempt to preserve Roman influence over the area in the face of a policy of expansion pursued by the Bishop of Constantinople.
Ascholius was present at the Second Council of Constantinople in 381
where the claims of Maximus the Cynic to the bishopric of Constantinople were rejected.

References
Patrologia Latina XIII, pp. 366–369.

4th-century Byzantine bishops
380s deaths
Bishops of Thessaloniki
Saints from Roman Greece